The women's triple jump event at the 2005 European Athletics U23 Championships was held in Erfurt, Germany, at Steigerwaldstadion on 14 and 16 July.

Medalists

Results

Final
16 July

Qualifications
14 July
Qualifying 13.50 or 12 best to the Final

Group A

Group B

Participation
According to an unofficial count, 15 athletes from 11 countries participated in the event.

 (1)
 (1)
 (2)
 (1)
 (1)
 (1)
 (1)
 (1)
 (3)
 (2)
 (1)

References

Triple jump
Triple jump at the European Athletics U23 Championships